Union Street is a street in Government Center, Boston, Massachusetts, near Faneuil Hall. Prior to 1828, it was also called Green Dragon Lane.

Image gallery

See also
 First Baptist Church (Boston, Massachusetts)
 James Franklin (printer)
 Green Dragon Tavern
 New England Holocaust Memorial
 Union Oyster House, i.e. Thomas Capen house

References

External links

 https://www.flickr.com/photos/mit-libraries/3402036978/ 1957
 https://www.flickr.com/photos/alakazoo/2311031679/ 2008
 https://www.flickr.com/photos/51035558262@N01/2315411695 2008

Streets in Boston
History of Boston
Government Center, Boston